The women's rugby sevens tournament at the 2016 Summer Olympics was held in Brazil, hosted at the Deodoro Stadium, a temporary outdoor stadium constructed as part of the Deodoro Modern Pentathlon Park in Rio de Janeiro. The tournament was held from 6 August to 8 August 2016, starting with group matches before finishing with the medal ceremony on 8 August.

Australia beat New Zealand 24–17 in the final. Canada secured the bronze medal with a win over Great Britain.

Qualification
With Brazil being the hosts, their team automatically qualified despite their sevens team not regularly appearing in the top 6 on the World Rugby Women's Sevens Series. The 2014–15 World Rugby Women's Sevens Series was the initial stage of qualification, where the top 4 teams at the end of the series gaining qualification to the 2016 Olympic Games. Between June and September 2015, each of the six regional rugby unions held an Olympic qualification event, where one team from each region qualified, bring the total up to 11 team qualified. The final spot was determined by a repechage tournament held in Monaco, where the winner of that event became the final team to qualify for the 2016 Olympic Games.

As a result of England finishing fourth in the 2014–15 Sevens World Series, Great Britain were awarded a spot in the Olympic games, despite the other nations failing to qualify in the top 4. This is because Great Britain compete as one union in the Olympics and as several in international rugby (England, Wales, Scotland and a combined union from Northern Ireland and Republic of Ireland), which meant should one of either the England, Wales or Scotland teams qualify, then Great Britain would be awarded a spot in the Olympic Games. It was decided players based in Northern Ireland were not eligible to represent Great Britain in the rugby sevens tournament as these players represent the IRFU, and the union demanded that Northern Irish players, that have committed to play for the Irish rugby union, only play for Ireland despite being eligible under IOC rules to compete for Great Britain. The three remaining unions agreed in advance of the 2013–14 Sevens World Series that their highest-finishing teams in that season would represent all three unions in the first stage of qualification.

Qualified teams

Squads

Match officials
On 11 April 2016, World Rugby announced a panel of twelve match officials for the women's sevens. Two Brazilians were later added as assistant referees.

 Aimee Barrett (South Africa)
 Jess Beard (New Zealand)
 Beatrice Benvenuti (Italy)
 James Bolabiu (Fiji)
 Sara Cox (Great Britain)
 Sakurako Kawasaki (Japan)
 Rose Labreche (Canada)
 Gabriel Lee (Hong Kong)
 Alhambra Nievas (Spain)
 Amy Perrett (Australia)
 Alex Pratt (Great Britain)
 Rasta Rasivhenge (South Africa)
 Mariana Wyse (Brazil) – Assistant referee
 Nayara Lima (Brazil) – Assistant referee

Draw
The draw for the tournament took place on 28 June 2016. The 12 teams were seeded based on their points they have accumulated over the past two seasons on the Women's Sevens Series circuit. The four teams that qualified directly from the 2014–15 Women's Sevens World Series were guaranteed a top four seeding, with their positioning determined by their combined score over the two seasons.

Pool stage
Group winners and runners-up advance to the quarter-finals. Third place teams drop to a third-placed teams table, where the top two third placed teams advance to the quarter-finals.

Pool A

Pool B

Pool C

Ranking of third-placed teams
The top two of the third-placed teams advance to the knockout rounds.

Knockout stage

9–12th place playoff

Semi-finals

11th place

9th place final

5–8th place playoff

Semi-finals

7th place

5th place final

Medal playoff

Quarter-finals

Semi-finals

Bronze medal match

Gold medal match

Final ranking

Statistics

Try scorers
10 tries
 Portia Woodman

7 tries

 Charlotte Caslick
 Emma Tonegato
 Kayla McAlister

6 tries
 Bianca Farella

5 tries

 Ghislaine Landry
 Lina Guérin
 Alev Kelter

4 tries

 Beatriz Futuro Muhlbauer
 Alice Richardson
 Jessica Javelet

3 tries

 Emilee Cherry
 Ellia Green
 Kayla Moleschi
 Karen Paquin
 Camille Grassineau
 Caroline Ladagnous
 Marie Yamaguchi
 Janet Musindalo Okelo
 Huriana Manuel

2 tries

 Nicole Beck
 Chloe Dalton
 Paula Ishibashi
 Cláudia Teles
 Raijieli Daveua
 Jade Le Pesq
 Abbie Brown
 Natasha Hunt
 Jasmine Joyce
 Emily Scarratt
 Emily Scott
 Danielle Waterman
 Joanne Watmore
 Amy Wilson-Hardy
 Ano Kuwai
 Celestine Navalayo Masinde
 Marina Bravo
 Amaia Erbina
 Iera Etxebarría
 Patricia García
 Joanne Fa'avesi
 Kathryn Johnson

1 try

 Shannon Parry
 Evania Pelite
 Amy Turner
 Sharni Williams
 Amanda Araújo
 Luiza Campos
 Isadora Cerullo
 Mariana Barbosa Ramalho
 Haline Scatrut
 Brittany Benn
 Jen Kish
 Kelly Russell
 Natasha Watcham-Roy
 Charity Williams
 Sharon Acevedo
 Khaterinne Medina
 Rusila Nagasau
 Litia Naiqato
 Timaima Ravisa
 Viniana Riwai
 Ana Maria Roqica
 Rebecca Tavo
 Lavenia Tinai
 Luisa Tisolo
 Audrey Amiel
 Fanny Horta
 Elodie Guiglion
 Marjorie Mayans
 Heather Fisher
 Katy McLean
 Yuka Kanematsu
 Yume Okuroda
 Doreen Remour Nziwa
 Irene Awino Otieno
 Kelly Brazier
 Gayle Broughton
 Theresa Fitzpatrick
 Tyla Nathan-Wong
 Ruby Tui
 Niall Williams
 María Casado
 Bárbara Pla
 Ryan Carlyle
 Lauren Doyle
 Richelle Stephens

Point scorers
50 points
 Portia Woodman

41 points
 Ghislaine Landry

35 points

 Charlotte Caslick
 Emma Tonegato
 Kayla McAlister

34 points
 Chloe Dalton

33 points
 Alev Kelter

30 points
 Bianca Farella

29 points
 Tyla Nathan-Wong

28 points
 Alice Richardson

25 points
 Lina Guérin

24 points
 Patricia García

20 points

 Beatriz Futuro Muhlbauer
 Jade Le Pesq
 Jessica Javelet

19 points
 Raquel Kochhann

17 points
 Katy McLean

15 points

 Emilee Cherry
 Ellia Green
 Kayla Moleschi
 Kelly Russell
 Karen Paquin
 Camille Grassineau
 Caroline Ladagnous
 Marie Yamaguchi
 Janet Musindalo Okelo
 Huriana Manuel

14 points
 Emily Scott

13 points
 Lavenia Tinai

10 points

 Nicole Beck
 Paula Ishibashi
 Cláudia Teles
 Raijieli Daveua
 Pauline Biscarat
 Abbie Brown
 Natasha Hunt
 Jasmine Joyce
 Emily Scarratt
 Danielle Waterman
 Joanne Watmore
 Amy Wilson-Hardy
 Ano Kuwai
 Celestine Navalayo Masinde
 Marina Bravo
 Amaia Erbina
 Iera Etxebarría
 Joanne Fa'avesi
 Kathryn Johnson

8 points
 Bui Baravilala

7 points

 Luisa Tisolo
 Viniana Riwai
 Yume Okuroda
 Kelly Brazier
 Richelle Stephens

5 points

 Shannon Parry
 Evania Pelite
 Amy Turner
 Sharni Williams
 Amanda Araújo
 Luiza Campos
 Isadora Cerullo
 Mariana Barbosa Ramalho
 Haline Scatrut
 Brittany Benn
 Jen Kish
 Natasha Watcham-Roy
 Charity Williams
 Sharon Acevedo
 Khaterinne Medina
 Rusila Nagasau
 Litia Naiqato
 Timaima Ravisa
 Ana Maria Roqica
 Rebecca Tavo
 Audrey Amiel
 Fanny Horta
 Elodie Guiglion
 Marjorie Mayans
 Heather Fisher
 Yuka Kanematsu
 Doreen Remour Nziwa
 Irene Awino Otieno
 Gayle Broughton
 Theresa Fitzpatrick
 Ruby Tui
 Niall Williams
 María Casado
 Bárbara Pla
 Ryan Carlyle
 Lauren Doyle

4 points
 Janet Awuor Awino

2 points

 Gemma Etheridge
 Tais Balconi
 Mio Yamanaka

See also
Rugby sevens at the 2016 Summer Olympics – Men's tournament

References

External links
Official website

 
Women's tournament
2016 in women's rugby union
Women's events at the 2016 Summer Olympics
Olympics